Atchison, Topeka and Santa Fe No. 1316 is a preserved 1309 class 4-6-2 "Pacific" type steam locomotive built by the Baldwin Locomotive Works in 1911 for the Atchison, Topeka and Santa Fe Railway. It was frequently used for pulling fast passenger trains in Texas, until it was reassigned to freight service in the late 1940s. After being retired in 1954, it was donated to the Fort Concho Museum in San Angelo, Texas for static display. In 1980, No. 1316 was acquired by the Texas State Railroad, who moved it to Rusk, Texas and restored it in 1982 as their No. 500. It continued to operate there until 2002, when it was found to be due for an overhaul, and it spent several years in storage, disassembled. As of 2023, No. 1316 has been put back together during a cosmetic restoration and it is awaiting the necessary overhaul required to operate it again.

History

Original service life 
From in the mid 1900s to the late 1910s, the Atchison, Topeka and Santa Fe Railway ordered a fleet of 329 4-6-2 "Pacific" types  from the Baldwin Locomotive Works of Philadelphia, Pennsylvania, and the road's own facility in Clovis, New Mexico, divided into eleven classes. One class was the 1309 class, which consisted of twenty-eight locomotives, numbered 1309–1336. When these locomotives were initially built, they were Balanced compound locomotives with four cylinders, which had a short-lived popularity with multiple class 1 railroads, including the Santa Fe. However, the Santa Fe's own experimental compound designs were known for being plagued with various mechanical problems and design flaws, including the fact they couldn't produce as much speed or tractive effort as expected. As the 1920s progressed, the Santa Fe had all their compound designs deemed unsuccessful, and they were either sold for scrap or rebuilt into conventional locomotives. No. 1316 became the first of the 1309 class to be rebuilt into a simple locomotive at the railroad's Clovis facility in March 1922, and the last of the 1309 class locomotives were given the same treatment by November 1927.

The 1309 class Pacifics were initially assigned to pull fast passenger trains across the Santa Fe system, and No. 1316 mostly pulled trains throughout various parts of West Texas, including the City of San Angelo. As larger steam locomotives were being introduced, including the 3450 class 4-6-4 "Hudsons" and the 3751 class 4-8-4 "Northerns", most of the road's 4-6-2s were reassigned to secondary passenger service and commuter service. As diesel locomotives were becoming popular with the Santa Fe during the 1940s, the 1309 class locomotives were again reassigned to pulling local freight trains, mostly in shortlines. As the 1950s progressed, scrapping commenced on the Santa Fe 4-6-2 fleet. On October 18, 1954, the Santa Fe retired No. 1316 from revenue service after it logged some 1,347,383 miles, and shortly afterward, it was donated to the Fort Concho Foundation in San Angelo, Texas, one of the main stomping grounds the locomotive formerly ran through, and it was put on static display at the Fort Concho's Museum for the next twenty-six years. By the end of the decade, No. 1316 became the sole survivor of the 1309 class, as all of its classmates were scrapped.

Texas State Railroad 
In 1976, the Texas State Railroad (TSRR), a former shortline that ran between Rusk and Palestine, Texas, was reopened as a tourist railroad by the Texas Parks and Wildlife Department. Four years later, while they had three operational steam locomotives by that point, management decided to find a slightly larger locomotive for their needs, and they ended up acquiring No. 1316. That summer, volunteers arrived at Fort Concho to prepare No. 1316 to be shipped by rail, and in the fall of that year, it was towed east-bound to their new facility in Rusk. When No. 1316 arrived in Rusk, restoration work began along with extensive modifications. During this process, the locomotive was also renumbered 500, since the TSRR decided to number their locomotives in order of size by hundreds, and until the arrival of Texas and Pacific 2-10-4 No. 610, No. 1316 was the largest of the TSRR roster. After nearly two years of work, TSRR No. 500 moved under its own power for the first time in twenty-eight years. The TSRR put No. 500 to use on daily trips between Rusk and Palestine alongside other locomotives, including 2-8-2 No. 400(Tremont and Gulf 30), Pershing 2-8-0 No. 300(Southern Pine Lumber Co. 28), 4-6-0 No. 201(Texas and Pacific 316), 4-6-0 No. 200(Southern Pacific 2248), and a small fleet of diesel units.

In 1995, the Federal Railroad Administration(FRA) introduced new federal boiler regulations and inspections for all active steam locomotives in the United States, and after twenty years of excursion service, and after participating in the centennial of the TSRR's service in 1996, No. 500 was sidelined for a required overhaul by the end of 2002. The TSRR disassembled No. 500, only to find it's boiler in poor condition after many years of usage, and instead of donating funds to repair it, the State of Texas offered the TSRR funds to build a brand new boiler that was designed for powerplant standards. However, due to a lack of time and money, and the fact their other steam locomotives had to be maintained as well, the FRA-required rebuild on No. 500 never came to fruition. In the fall of 2019, the TSRR announced that they would put No. 500 back together for cosmetic purposes for the general public to view, and this process included reverting the locomotive to its original identity as Santa Fe No. 1316. In early 2020, the cosmetic refurbishment was completed, and No. 1316 was put on static display in the "Hall of Giants" in Palestine side by side with No. 610. As of 2023, No. 1316's restoration will likely happen after No. 316's rebuild takes place, which will happen after No. 30's running gear is repaired.

Film history 
While it was still liveried as TSRR No. 500, No. 1316 was featured as one of the locomotives that pulled a passenger train in the 1986 comedy Western film Uphill All the Way, which starred Roy Clark, Mel Tillis, and Burl Ives, and it was directed by Frank Q. Dobbs.

See also 

 Santa Fe 3415
 Southern Pacific 786
 Tremont and Gulf 30
Southern Pine Lumber Co. 28
 Texas and Pacific 610

External links 
 Texas State Railroad Official Website

References 

1316
4-6-2 locomotives
Individual locomotives of the United States
Standard gauge locomotives of the United States
Standard gauge steam locomotives
Railway locomotives introduced in 1911
Preserved steam locomotives of Texas